Sidi Taibi is a town in Kénitra Province, Rabat-Salé-Kénitra, Morocco. According to the 2004 census it had a population of 19,979.

References

Populated places in Kénitra Province
Rural communes of Rabat-Salé-Kénitra